The Anthi Karagianni Municipal Stadium, formerly the  Kavala National Stadium, is a multi-purpose stadium in Kavala, Greece. It is the homebase of Kavala F.C. The stadium was built 1970, and currently has a seating capacity of 10,550. It is named  after the paralympic athlete, Anthi Karagianni, who won three silver medals in the 2004 Paralympic Games.

References

External links
 Kavala Stadium (Anthi Karagianni) profile at Stadia.gr

Sport in Kavala
Football venues in Greece
Multi-purpose stadiums in Greece
Buildings and structures in Kavala
Kavala F.C.